Calapooya Creek is a tributary, about  long, of the Umpqua River in Douglas County in the U.S. state of Oregon. Formed by its north and south forks, the creek drains a mountainous region south of the Calapooya Divide and east of Oakland and Sutherlin.

From its source, the creek flows generally southwest through or near Nonpareil and Oakland. Near Oakland it passes under Oregon Route 99 and Interstate 5 and further downstream Oregon Route 138 before entering the river at the rural community of Umpqua.

Bridge
Built in 1933, its unusual design features side windows with curved tops.

Tributaries
Named tributaries from source to mouth are the North Fork Calapooya Creek and South Fork Calapooya Creek. Then come White, Coon, Timothy, Buzzard Roost, Cooper, and Filler creeks. Below these come Jeffers, Hinkle, Gilbreath, Gassy, Cantell, Pelland, Long Valley, and Banks creeks. Further downstream are Foster, Oldham, Pollock, Cabin, Cook, Dodge Canyon, Coon, and Burke creeks.

See also
 List of rivers of Oregon

References

External links
Partnership for the Umpqua Rivers

Rivers of Oregon
Rivers of Douglas County, Oregon